Ernest Lush (23 January 190812 May 1988) was an English classical pianist who was best known as an accompanist.

Biography
Ernest Henry Lush was born in Bournemouth in 1908.  His musical studies were with Tobias Matthay in London and Carl Friedberg in New York.

He made his first radio broadcast at the age of 15 in 1923. His concert debut came in 1927, with a concerto under the baton of Sir Dan Godfrey.  He joined the BBC and became a senior staff accompanist, while continuing to be involved in chamber music, solo piano recitals and concerto appearances.

He appeared in a great many of the 93 concerts given between 1955 and 1967 under the auspices of the BBC Concert Orchestra at various venues outside London.

The roll of artists he accompanied includes: Janet Baker, Owen Brannigan, Alfredo Campoli, Suzanne Danco, Jacqueline du Pré (her very first recital), Kathleen Ferrier (her last broadcast recital), Pierre Fournier, Thomas Hemsley, Nathan Milstein, Ossy Renardy, Ruggiero Ricci, Peter Schidlof, Paul Schöffler, Elisabeth Schumann, Igor Stravinsky, Joan Sutherland, Inia Te Wiata, Jennifer Vyvyan and  Ljuba Welitsch.

Ernest Lush died in 1988, aged 80, in Harrogate.

References

1908 births
1988 deaths
English classical pianists
Male classical pianists
Pupils of Tobias Matthay
Classical accompanists
20th-century classical pianists
20th-century English musicians
Musicians from Bournemouth
20th-century British male musicians